Mometa is a genus of moths in the family Gelechiidae.

Species
 Mometa anthophthora (Meyrick, 1937)
 Mometa chlidanopa Meyrick, 1927
 Mometa infricta (Meyrick, 1916)
 Mometa zemiodes Durrant, 1914

References

Pexicopiini